Hans Abich (4 August 1918 – 17 July 2003) was a German film producer.

Selected filmography
 Love '47 (1949)
 Keepers of the Night (1949)
 A Day Will Come (1950)
 The Day Before the Wedding (1952)
 His Royal Highness (1953)
 Beloved Life (1953)
 She (1954)
 Mamitschka (1955)
 Night of Decision (1956)
 Without You All Is Darkness (1956)
 Confessions of Felix Krull (1957)
 Rose Bernd (1957)
 The Glass Tower (1957)
 Wir Wunderkinder (1958)
 Restless Night (1958)
 A Woman Who Knows What She Wants (1958)
 The Man Who Sold Himself (1959)
 People in the Net (1959)
 The Buddenbrooks (1959)
 Two Times Adam, One Time Eve (1959)
 Storm in a Water Glass (1960)
 Beloved Augustin (1960)
 The Ambassador (1960)
 Stage Fright (1960)
 Agatha, Stop That Murdering! (1960)
 Tonio Kröger (1964)

References

Bibliography
 Eric Rentschler. West German filmmakers on film: visions and voices. Holmes & Meier, 1988.

External links

1918 births
2003 deaths
German film producers
ARD (broadcaster) people
Radio Bremen people
People from Upper Lusatia